Archolaemus blax is a species of glass knifefish endemic to Brazil where it is found in the Rio Tocantins.

References
 

Sternopygidae
Fish of South America
Fish of Brazil
Taxa named by Maarten Korringa
Fish described in 1970